This article is a list of forts in Washington County, Pennsylvania.  During the colonial era and the American Revolution, Washington County, Pennsylvania was on the American Frontier.  The forts provided protection for settlers from attacks by Indians who already lived in the area.

Doddridge's Fort 

Doddridge's Fort was a series of stockaded log cabins in Washington County, Pennsylvania.  It was built c. 1773 by John Doddridge as a refuge for settlers in area, which was then the American frontier. The fort was located in present-day Independence Township, Washington County, Pennsylvania.  The attack on Doddridge's Fort was recorded in historian's Samuel Kercheval 1883 history A History of the Valley of Virginia.

The fort was a frequent stop for Methodist circuit riders, including Francis Asbury. It was also the childhood home of priest-physician Joseph Doddridge, author of the widely cited Notes on the Settlement and Indian Wars of the Western Parts of Virginia and Pennsylvania, and his brother Philip Doddridge, a leading advocate for democratization on behalf of western Virginians.

The actual location of the fort was north of the marker.

In 2003, plans were developed for the Washington County Historical Society to create a replica of Doddridge's Fort at Cross Creek County Park.  The facility was to have been known as The Washington County Frontier Experience Center.

Lindley's Fort 
Lindley's Fort was a blockhouse established by frontier settler Demas Lindley near Ten Mile Creek in what is now the village of Prosperity in Morris Township, Washington County.

County historian Alfred Creigh described it as "one of the strongest forts in the western country, because it most exposed to the hostile incursions of the savage inhabitants." Frontier settlers erected additional cabins near the fort as temporary homes during times of increased danger in order to easily retreat with the fort's walls.

In 2011, Lindley's Fort became the subject of dispute. Archaeologists and local historians expressed concern that natural gas extraction operator Range Resources planned to construct a drilling pad access road through the historic site.

Miller's Blockhouse 

Miller's Blockhouse was a blockhouse built in about 1780 by Jacob Miller, Sr., a pioneer in American Frontier in present-day Washington County, Pennsylvania.  The fort served to protect settlers in the Dutch Fork area from Indian attacks.  On March 31, 1782, the fort was attacked, and Ann Hupp led a heroic defense.

Rice's Fort 

Rice's Fort was a fortified blockhouse in present-day Washington County, Pennsylvania.  During the American Revolution, it was built by Abraham Rice along Buffalo Creek.  In September 1782, the occupants successfully held off a siege Indians.  The attack on Rice's Fort was recorded in historian's Samuel Kercheval 1883 history A History of the Valley of Virginia.

Wolff's Fort 

Wolff's Fort was a stockaded log house built in about 1780 by Jacob Wolfe.  The Pennsylvania Historical & Museum Commission describes it as "one of the most important forts in the area."

References 

Pennsylvania, Washington County
Colonial forts in Pennsylvania
Forts in Washington County